Surzhyk (Ukrainian and Russian: суржик) refers to a range of mixed sociolects of Ukrainian and Russian languages used in certain regions of Ukraine and the neighboring regions of Russia and Moldova. There is no unifying set of characteristics; the term is, according to some authors, used for "norm-breaking, non-obedience to or non-awareness of the rules of the Ukrainian and Russian standard languages".

Surzhyk is a Ukrainian word that could refer to any mixed language, not necessarily including Ukrainian or Russian. When used by non-Ukrainian speaking people of Ukraine, the word is most commonly used to refer to a mix of Ukrainian with another language, not necessarily Russian. When used in Russia the word almost always specifically refers to a Ukrainian-Russian language mix. It differs from both Ukrainian and spoken "Ukrainian Russian", although it is impossible to draw a clear line between them and surzhyk.

The vocabulary mix of each of its constituent languages (Ukrainian and Russian) varies greatly from locality to locality, or sometimes even from person to person, depending on the degree of education, personal experience, rural or urban residence, the geographical origin of the interlocutors, etc. The percentage of Russian words and phonetic influences tends to be greatest in the east and south and in the vicinity of big Russian-speaking cities. It is commonly spoken in most of eastern Ukraine's rural areas, with the exception of the large metropolitan areas of Donetsk, Kharkiv, and Luhansk, where the majority of the population uses standard Russian. In rural areas of western Ukraine, the language spoken contains fewer Russian elements than in central and eastern Ukraine but has nonetheless been influenced by Russian.

The ancient common origin, and relatively recent divergence, of Russian and Ukrainian make it difficult to establish the degree of mixing in a vernacular of this sort.

Etymology
The Ukrainian word surzhyk (from Proto-Slavic *sǫ — «with» + *rъžь — «rye») —  originally referred to mix of different grains that includes rye or a product like flour or bread made from such a mix.

Prevalence

According to data presented by the Kyiv International Institute of Sociology in 2003, 11% to 18% of the people of Ukraine were found to communicate in Surzhyk. Specifically, in western Ukraine, Surzhyk is spoken by 2.5% of the population, while in the south, it is spoken by over 12.4% of the population. In the east, 9.6% of the population speaks Surzhyk. As Western Ukraine has a higher ratio of Ukrainian speakers to Russian speakers than the rest of Ukraine, the lesser proportion of Surzhyk speakers compared with the east and south is understandable.

One problem in analysing the linguistic status of Ukraine is that there is a tendency for code-switching errors to exist across the entire spectrum of languages. In other words, those who identify themselves as Russian-speaking or Ukrainian-speaking can often be found blending the two languages to some degree. Only a few of these individuals were found to acknowledge the non-standardness of the use of either or both languages, or the fact that they were actually blending Russian and Ukrainian in their speech at all.

History

Pre-Soviet era
Surzhyk originated at the end of the 18th century, when Ukrainian peasants started to have greater contact with the Russian language as Ukrainian society modernized. Industrialization resulted in workers migrating from Central Russia to Ukrainian cities and the urbanization of the Ukrainian peasantry. Russian civil and military administration, together with cultural, business, religious and educational institutions, soon became forces of linguistic Russification. Ukrainian peasants moving to the cities regarded Russian as being more urban and prestigious than their own language. However, because their schooling in the Russian language was inadequate, most Ukrainian peasants who strove to speak it ended up blending it with their native Ukrainian; this was how Surzhyk was born.

The speaking of pure Ukrainian (i.e. a language without elements of Russian), was for the most part avoided by the urban intelligentsia, because the Ukrainian language was associated with provincialism and nationalism. At this point, the majority of Ukrainians found it easy to become competent in Russian. The association of the Ukrainian language with a rural lifestyle or narrow-minded nationalism encouraged more Ukrainians to adopt Russian as their language of choice. Such decisions led to an increased prevalence of Surzhyk in everyday speech and the further dilution of the Ukrainian language.

In 1721, the Russian Tsar Peter the Great prohibited the publication of books in Ukraine, except for Russian-language religious works, and decreed that Ukrainian books and records were to be burned. In 1786, it was decreed that services in the Ukrainian Orthodox Church were to be conducted using only the Russian pronunciation of Old Church Slavonic, and not the Ukrainian pronunciation. Decrees in 1863, 1876, and 1881 prohibited the publication and importation of Ukrainian books, as well as the public use of the Ukrainian language in general. The Russian regime of the day viewed the use of Ukrainian as evidence of political opposition and harshly suppressed it.

The use of the Ukrainian language in theatre and music was also banned, and it had to be translated into other languages. Education in the Ukrainian language also suffered similarly, with ethnically Ukrainian teachers being replaced with ethnic Russians. In the early 20th century, children were punished for speaking Ukrainian to one another in school, and people sometimes lost their jobs for speaking it.

Kingdom of Hungary's rule in western Ukraine in the late 18th and 19th centuries was also linguistically oppressive. For example, in Zakarpattia, Hungarian was the only language permitted by the regime, so Ukrainian was excluded from institutions like schools. Even so, language policies here were not as restrictive as those applied in eastern Ukraine by the Tsarist regime of Russia.

Soviet era
In the 1920s, after Ukraine became a part of the Soviet Union, the Ukrainian language saw a revival under the Soviet policy of korenizatsiya (nativisation), which supported the development of non-Russian languages. The purpose was to gain the support of those ethnic groups that had been oppressed by the Tsarist regime. Soviet government business in Ukraine was conducted in the Ukrainian language, with the aim of integrating the Ukrainian people into the new Soviet system. This Ukrainianisation brought with it a significant advance in the development, standardisation, and codification of the Ukrainian language. Accompanying it was an increase in the number of Ukrainian-language publications, as well as theatre productions and schools in which Ukrainian was used.

From the 1930s onwards, the Russian language exerted significant influence on Ukrainian, and the regime of Joseph Stalin began to actively suppress the Ukrainian language. Along with many of the other languages spoken in the Soviet Union, Ukrainian was viewed as a challenge to centralised power and the linguistic unification of the Soviet people. Terminology and wording that was similar or identical to Russian was emphasized in dictionaries, grammar books, and the official guidance issued to editors and publishers. This resulted in a generally more Russianised Ukrainian than had existed prior to the Soviet Union. After Ukraine became independent, this outcome would eventually generate disagreement regarding the question of what constitutes pure Ukrainian.

Words and other Ukrainian-language speech forms that are similar to those of Russian were emphasised. In addition, many Russian words or terms replaced their Ukrainian equivalents and were then modified by Ukrainian grammar and phonetics. The following table contains a few examples of how the Ukrainian language was changed during the Soviet era. 
 

Members of the cultural elite who promoted local languages were later purged from positions of authority during the reign of Stalin, as part of an effort to strengthen the cohesion of the Soviet Union and promote Russian as the official language of the Soviet Union.

Independence in the modern era
After the collapse of the Soviet Union and the emergence of Ukraine as a sovereign state, the Ukrainian language became a key issue in the nation's politics. Ukrainian became Ukraine’s sole official language, and therefore the ability to master it in speech became an important skill for politicians and other prominent figures. Many such individuals were speakers of Russian who began to use Ukrainian, but because they had not perfected it another form of Surzhyk emerged which clearly showed the effect of Russification on the Ukrainian language.

Linguists began to engage in debates over the 'correct' way to speak Ukrainian, because the Soviet language policies had had a profound effect on the Ukrainian language. On the one hand, some linguists argue that Ukrainian should only use the forms that existed prior to the Soviet Union, while others argue that the current forms, which emerged from the Soviet language policy, are more up-to-date and more familiar to the Ukrainians of today, and would therefore be better at meeting contemporary needs.

Ethnopolitical issues
In Soviet times, the usage of Ukrainian gradually decreased, particularly during those times when the Russification policies intensified (i.e. in the 1930s and during the late 1970s to early 1980s), and so a sizable portion of ethnic Ukrainians possess a better knowledge of formal Russian than of formal Ukrainian.  Since 1991, however, Ukrainian has been the sole official language. After this change, it was realised that much of the population of Ukraine was actually unable to speak Ukrainian fluently. This was highly apparent in the case of many Ukrainian officials (including the President of Ukraine), who were observed to make code-mixing mistakes in their speech. 

The prevalence of Surzhyk is greatest in the countryside. In the cities, people tend to speak purer forms of Ukrainian or Russian. This contrasts with the more rural inhabitants, who lack the prestige associated with the educational and technological advantages that people in the cities have. However, in spite of the differences that exist between the rural and urban varieties of the spoken language, many visitors find that they have trouble communicating with the local population of Ukraine when they follow guidebooks published abroad. This is because these books tend to focus on either pure Russian or pure Ukrainian and disregard the hybrid form.

The speaking of Surzhyk instead of Russian or Ukrainian is viewed negatively by nationalist language activists. Because it is neither the one nor the other, they regard Surzhyk as a threat to the uniqueness of Ukrainian culture.

Literature
Nikolai Gogol used the language extensively in his short story collection Evenings on a Farm Near Dikanka. Surzhyk has been an object of parody in Ukrainian literature since the very emergence of the Ukrainian language. For example, in the 1798 poem Eneyida, written by Ivan Kotlyarevsky and based on the Latin poem Aeneid, for satirical purposes the character "Filozop" speaks Surzhyk while standing over the dead Pallas.

In popular culture
Surzhyk is often also used for comic effect in the arts. Examples include the short plays of Les Poderviansky, and the repertoire of the pop star Verka Serdyuchka. The punk-rock group Braty Hadyukiny (literally “viper's brothers”) sings many of its songs in Surzhyk, often to underscore the rural simplicity of its songs' protagonists.

See also 
 Balachka — dialects of Kuban Cossacks
 Linguistic Russification — the process of introducing the Russian language into non-Russian communities
 Russification of Ukraine
 Trasianka — an interlanguage derived from Belarusian and Russian, spoken in Belarus
 West Polesian — an intermediate dialect that blends Ukrainian and Belarusian.

References 

 
 Del Gaudio S. On the Nature of Suržyk: a Double Perspective. Wiener Slawistischer Almanach, Sonderband 75. München – Berlin – Wien 2010.

External links 
 How Do Ukrainians communicate?
 Surzhyk and national identity in Ukrainian nationalist language ideology (Niklas Bernsand in Berliner Osteuropa-Info, Vol. 17 - page 41 -, Freie Universität, Berlin)
 Language Contact: Morphosyntactic Analysis of Surzhyk Spoken in Central Ukraine (Kateryna Kent, University of Minnesota, Twin Cities)

Ukrainian language varieties and styles
Russian language varieties and styles
Mixed languages
Russification